Agrupación Deportiva Orcasitas is a Spanish football team from Usera district, Madrid. The club was founded on 1960.

Season to season

7 seasons in Tercera División

Uniform
Uniform holder Red shirt, blue trousers and half red.
Uniform alternativeT-shirt, trousers and half white.

Stadium
Their home stadium is the Estadio A.V. de Orcasitas, which seats 3,000 spectators.

External links
Official website
Facebook page
Profile

Usera
Football clubs in Madrid
Divisiones Regionales de Fútbol clubs
Association football clubs established in 1960
1960 establishments in Spain